Diego David Vega (born 1968) is a Colombian-American composer and music professor whose work blends elements of traditional Colombian music with contemporary styles. He has created works for a variety of ensembles, including soloists, chamber groups, and symphony orchestras. Vega is also an experienced music educator, having taught composition and theory in both Colombia and the United States. He became an associate professor at the University of Nevada, Las Vegas School of Music in 2011, and has received commissions from institutions such as the National Symphony Orchestra of Colombia and Maîtrise Notre Dame de Paris.

Education and career 
Vega studied at the Javeriana University in Bogotá, Colombia, where he earned his Bachelor of Music. He also studied at the Cincinnati College-Conservatory of Music in Cincinnati, Ohio, where he earned his Master of Music, and at Cornell University in Ithaca, New York, where he earned his doctorate. Among other teachers, his composition teachers were Guillermo Gaviria, Ricardo Zohn-Muldoon, Joel Hoffman, Roberto Sierra, and Steven Stucky.

Following his studies, he was a visiting assistant professor of composition and music theory at the Setnor School of Music at Syracuse University in Syracuse, New York, and an associate professor at the Faculty of Music at the Javeriana University. He has held a faculty position at the University of Nevada, Las Vegas School of Music since 2011.

Vega is one of five composers for the album Reason & Reverence which was released in June 2018 by Navona Records. The composers are described as having developed "a compelling, philosophical reflection of the world we live in."  Petr Vronský conducted, and the Moravian Philharmonic Orchestra delivers the compositions.

Composition and music style
Diego Vega's musical style is characterized by a synthesis of classical music, Colombian music, jazz, and his favorite composers. He often incorporates elements of Colombian traditional music into his works, such as rhythms, melodies, harmonies, and instruments. He also explores the use of complex textures, polyrhythms, polytonality, and extended techniques. He is influenced by composers from different periods and genres, such as Prokofiev, Debussy, Ravel, Stravinsky, Bartók, Ligeti, Lutoslawski, Messiaen, Stucky, and many others. Latin American writers have inspired some of his works, such as "hlör u fang axaxaxas mlö" (2004) for clarinet, violin, cello and piano, which was influenced by Jorge Luis Borges’ writings, and his recent ballet "Espíritu de Pájaro", which was based on poems by Colombian indigenous authors.

Recognition
Vega has won several awards for his compositions, including the Colombian National Prize of Music in Composition in 2004, the Ensemble X composition competition in 2004, the Ithaca College Chamber Orchestra Composition Competition in 2010, and the Alea III 20th anniversary prize in 2002. His music has been performed by notable ensembles, including the Norwegian Radio Orchestra, Eighth Blackbird, Youth Orchestra of the Americas, National Symphony Orchestra of Colombia, Bogotá Philharmonic, Soli Chamber Ensemble, and Cuarteto Latinoamericano.

Compositions

Works for orchestra 
 1992 Sinfonía, for string orchestra
 1993 Sinfonía en un Movimiento
 1996 Concierto, for clarinet and orchestra
 2002 Movimiento, for piano and chamber orchestra
 2007 Tumbaos, for orchestra
 2022 Espritu de Pajaro

Espíritu de Pájaro is a contemporary dance performance and symphonic music composition commissioned by the National Symphony Orchestra of Colombia. It is dedicated to the indigenous communities of Colombia. The ballet was inspired by poems written by authors such as Hugo Jamioy from the Kamëntsá people, Fredy Chikangana from the Yanakuna people, and Vito Apüshana from the Wayuu people. It premiered at the Teatro de Cristóbal Colón in Bogotá on November 4 and 5, 2022, with choreography by Álvaro Restrepo and conducted by Juan Felipe Molano.

Works for wind band 
 1998 Audi Reliqua, for wind band
 2003 Selección Múltiple para Vientos

Masses, cantatas, and sacred music 
 1994-1995 Misa de Pentecostés, for mixed choir, children's choir, organ, brass quintet, and timpani
 1995 Motetes Notre-Dame, for mixed choir

Works for choir 
 2004 Canticum Novum, for mixed choir

Chamber music 
 1990 Sonata, for clarinet and piano
 1991 Suite para Cuarteto de Maderas, for flute, oboe, clarinet, and bassoon
 1999 De Profundis, for flute, clarinet, violin, cello, piano, and percussion
 2000 String Quartet
 2000 Diferencias, for flute, clarinet, violin, cello, piano, and percussion
 2001 (Di)Ego Dixi, for flute and piano
 2004 hlör u fang axaxaxas mlö, for clarinet, violin, cello, and piano
 2006 Nocturno, for viola and piano

Works for piano 
 1990 Cuatro Piezas para Piano
 1990 Sonatina

Electronic music 
 1999 iii..., for computer
 2000 Este pueblo está lleno de ecos, for computer

References

Christian music
Colombian composers
Colombian conductors (music)
20th-century composers
21st-century composers
Electronic music
1968 births
21st-century American composers
21st-century American male musicians
21st-century classical composers
American classical composers
American contemporary classical composers
American electronic musicians
American male classical composers
University of Cincinnati – College-Conservatory of Music alumni
Cornell University alumni
Living people
Musicians from Bogotá